Craze is a 1974 horror film directed by Freddie Francis. It stars Jack Palance as a psychotic antiques dealer who sacrifices women to the statue of  Chuku, an African idol.

It was the last film produced by Herman Cohen.

Cast
 Jack Palance as Neal Mottram
 Diana Dors as Dolly  Newman
 Julie Ege as Helena
 Edith Evans as Aunt Louise
 Hugh Griffith as Solicitor
 Trevor Howard as Bellamy
 Suzy Kendall as Sally
 Michael Jayston as Wall
 Martin Potter as Ronnie
 Percy Herbert as Detective Russet
 David Warbeck as Detective Wilson
 Kathleen Byron as Muriel Sharp

Production
The film was based on a 1967 novel The Infernal Idol. In 1972 it was reported Herman Cohen had the rights and a script was being written.

In March 1972 it was announced Jack Palance would star in a film version, which would be a co production between Herman Cohen and Joe Solomon.

Freddie Francis had made a number of horror movies for Amicus and other producers, including Herman Cohen for whom he directed Trog. Francis later said "no sooner had I started it than I realised I was flogging a dead horse." The director says there were "only four good things about" the movie - Palance, Trevor Howard, Edith Evans and Hugh Griffith, adding "Jack lost interest in it almost straight away, Hugh and Trevor were both heavily on the bottle and dear Edith thought we were making a "proper" film and therefore had all the time in the world." Francis says because the cast included Howard and Griffith, Evans thought there was plenty of time to block scenes, when Francis only had a six week schedule.

Palance arrived in London to make the film which began filming in March 1973. Cohen says he got along with Palance but "everyone else was afraid of Jack - he has that aura about him. Freddi Francis was scared stiff of him."

Francis later said, "Even Jack couldn’t  help that one. I thought we could’ve made something of it with Jack, but once again Herman had this old Aben Kandel writing the scripts and I think Abe would do anything Herman told him.”

Diana Dors had previously made Berserk for Cohen.

Reception
Cohen says the film "did very well" financially but was hurt because the producer had sold the film to National General in the US, who were bought about by Warner Bros; this caused a delay in the film's release in the US.

Notes

References

External links
 
 Craze at Letterbox DVD

1974 films
Films directed by Freddie Francis
Films scored by John Scott (composer)
British horror films
1970s English-language films
1970s British films